Trogon is a genus of Coraciimorphae birds in the trogon  family. Its members occur in forests and woodlands of the Americas, ranging from southeastern Arizona to northern Argentina.

They have large eyes, stout hooked bills, short wings, and long, squared-off, strongly graduated tails; black and white tail-feather markings form distinctive patterns on the underside.  Males have richly colored metallic plumage, metallic on the upperparts. Although many have brightly coloured bare eye-rings, they lack the colorful patches of bare facial skin in their African counterparts, Apaloderma.  Females and young are duller and sometimes hard to identify in the field.  Eggs are white or bluish-white, unlike the pale blue eggs of quetzals.  See the family account for further details.

Taxonomy
The genus Trogon was introduced by the French zoologist Mathurin Jacques Brisson in 1760 with the green-backed trogon (Trogon viridis) as the type species. The name of the genus is from the Ancient Greek τρωγων trōgōn for  "fruit-eating" or "gnawing". The name had previously been used by the German naturalist Paul Möhring in 1752 for the blue-crowned trogon (Trogon curucui).

The following cladogram shows the relationships between the 20 species placed in the genus. It is based on a molecular phylogenetic study by Jeffrey Dacosta and John Klicka that was published in 2008. The cladogram incorporates the species splits that resulted from this study. 

Certain plumage features map onto the phylogeny. In Clade A the females are brown-backed while in the other two clades females are gray-backed. The males in Clade A are all green-headed. In Clade B the males are green-headed and have mostly dark undertail patterns. In Clade C males are blue- or black-headed and have white or contrasting black-and-white undertail patterns. The belly color does not map onto the phylogeny. For example, in Clade C Baird's trogon is red-bellied while the white-tailed trogon is yellow-bellied. Similarly, the blue-crowned trogon is red-bellied while the Guianan trogon is yellow-bellied.

Species
The 20 species now recognised in the genus are:

References

 
Trogonidae
Bird genera

ca:Trogon